Jean de Tulles may refer to:
 Jean de Tulles (died 1608), bishop of Orange

 Jean de Tulles (died 1640), bishop of Orange, nephew of the preceding